Never Let You Go may refer to be:

 Never Let You Go (album), by Rita Coolidge, 1983
 "Never Let You Go" (Dima Bilan song), representing Russia at Eurovision 2006
 "Never Let You Go" (Evermore song), 2007
 "Never Let You Go" (Justin Bieber song), 2010
 "Never Let You Go" (Mando song), representing Greece at Eurovision 2003
 "Never Let You Go" (New Kids on the Block song), 1994
 "Never Let You Go" (Rudimental song), 2015
 "Never Let You Go" (Slushii song), 2019
 "Never Let You Go" (Sweet Sensation song), 1988
 "Never Let You Go" (Third Eye Blind song), 2000
 "Never Let You Go: Shindemo Hanasanai", a song by 2AM, 2012
 "Never Let You Go", a song by Colbie Caillat from Breakthrough, 2009
 "Never Let You Go", a song by F.Cuz, 2011
 "Never Let You Go", a song by Julian Lennon from Everything Changes
 "Never Let You Go", a song by Kygo from Kids in Love, 2017
 "Never Let You Go", a song by White Lion from Return of the Pride, 2008
 "Never Let You Go", a song by Ideal from their self-titled album, 1999

See also
 "Never Ever Let You Go", a song by Rollo & King, representing Denmark at Eurovision 2001
 Never Gonna Let You Go (disambiguation)
 Never Let Me Go (disambiguation)